Damon Garrett Riddick (born June 15, 1971), better known by his stage name Dâm-Funk (stylized as DāM-FunK; pronounced "Dame-Funk"), is an American funk musician, vocalist and producer from Pasadena, California. In 2007, Riddick signed with the L.A.-based record label Stones Throw Records.

Partial discography

Solo albums 
 Toeachizown (Stones Throw, 2009)
 Invite the Light (Stones Throw, 2015) 
 Private Life  (Music from Memory, 2017)
 Above the Fray (Glydezone, 2021)

Collaborative albums
 Higher (with Steve Arrington) (Stones Throw, 2013)
 7 Days of Funk (with Snoopzilla as 7 Days of Funk) (Stones Throw, 2013)

Extended plays
 LA Series #7 (with Computer Jay) (All City Dublin, 2010)
 InnaFocusedDaze (Scion/AV, 2011)
 I Don't Wanna Be A Star! (Stones Throw, 2012)
 STFU (Stones Throw, 2015)
 Architecture (Saft, 2016)
 Nite Funk (2016) (with Nite Jewel)
 STFU II (Glydezone, 2019)

Compilations
 Rhythm Trax Vol. 4 (Stones Throw, 2009)
 Adolescent Funk (Stones Throw, 2010)
 California (Welcome to Los Santos, 2015)

Singles
 "Burgundy City" (Stones Throw, 2008)
 "Japan Groove" (Stones Throw, 2009)
 "It's My Life" (Circle Star, 2009)
 "Let's Take Off (Far Away)" (Stones Throw, 2009)
 "Hood Pass Intact" (Stones Throw, 2010)
 "What's on Your Mind" (Tony Cook featuring Dâm-Funk) (Stones Throw, 2010)
 "Faden Away" (Stones Throw, 2013) (with Snoopzilla as 7 Days of Funk)
 "Damn, dis-moi"/"Girlfriend" (Christine and the Queens featuring Dâm Funk) (Because Music, 2018)

References
Footnotes

Sources
 [ Review], Allmusic
 Interview in The FADER Magazine :: DāM-FunK cover feature, circa. 2009
 Review, Dusted Magazine
 Review, Pitchfork Media
 Review, Prefix Magazine
 Review, XLR8R
Concert Review, The New York Times

External links
 DāM-FunK at Discogs

Record producers from California
Singers from California
Living people
Stones Throw Records artists
American boogie musicians
American funk singers
1971 births
21st-century American singers
21st-century American male singers